Mark A. Horowitz is the Yahoo! Founders Professor in the School of Engineering at Stanford University and holds a joint appointment in the Electrical Engineering and Computer Science department. He is a co-founder of Rambus Inc., now a technology licensing company.

Education
Horowitz received bachelor's and master's degrees in electrical engineering from the Massachusetts Institute of Technology in 1978. After graduating, he moved to Silicon Valley to work at Signetics, one of the early integrated circuits companies. After working for a year, he entered Stanford, and worked on CAD tools for very-large-scale integration (VLSI) design. His research at Stanford included some of the earliest work on extracting the resistance of integrated circuit wires, and estimating the delay of MOS transistor circuits. He was advised at Stanford by Robert Dutton and graduated with a Ph.D. in electrical engineering in 1984.

Academic career
In 1984, Horowitz joined the Stanford faculty. At Stanford his research focused on VLSI circuits and he led a number of early RISC processor designs, including MIPS-X. His research has been in the fields of electrical engineering, computer science, and applying engineering tools to biology. He has worked on RISC processors, multiprocessor designs, low-power circuits, high-speed links, computational photography, and applying engineering to biology. Horowitz and his research group at Stanford pioneered many innovations in high-speed link design, and many of today’s high speed link designs are designed by his former students or colleagues from Rambus. 

In the 2000s he teamed up with Marc Levoy to work on computational photography, research which explored how to use computation to create better pictures, often by using data from multiple sensors. This research also explored light-field photography, which captured enough information to allow a computer to reconstruct the view to an arbitrary viewpoint. The need to capture light-fields to process led to the creation of the Stanford Camera Array, a system which could synchronize and collect images from 100 image sensors, as well as work that eventually led to the Lytro camera, whose photographs could be refocused after they were captured.

In 2006, Horowitz received the IEEE Donald O. Pederson Award in Solid-State Circuits "for pioneering contributions to the design of high-performance digital integrated circuits and systems". In 2007, he was elected to the National Academy of Engineering for his "leadership in high-bandwidth memory-interface technology and in scalable cache-coherent multiprocessor architectures." In 2008, he was elected to the American Academy of Arts and Sciences. At the 2014 International Solid-State Circuits Conference, he presented his studies on the outlook for the semiconductor industry in Computing's Energy Problem (And What We Can Do About It).

In 2018 Horowitz founded the AHA Agile Hardware Project at Stanford University and has led it ever since. The program aims to "enable a more agile hardware development flow" by creating "an open source hardware/software tool chain to rapidly create and validate alternative hardware implementations and a new open-source system ARM/CGRA SoC which will enable rapid execution/emulation of the resulting design." The project is funded by Intel's Science and Technology Center, DARPA, the National Science Foundation, Amazon Web Services, Meta Platforms Inc.,Apple Inc., Advanced Micro Devices,Nvidia, Qualcomm, and Google. He also helps lead Stanford's Quantum Fundamentals, ARchitectures and Machines initiative (Q-FARM) which aims to harness the expertise and facilities of Stanford University and the SLAC National Accelerator Laboratory to accelerate the development of quantum information science.

Business
In 1990 Horowitz took a leave of absence from Stanford to work with Mike Farmwald on a new high-bandwidth DRAM design which, in April of that year, led to the formation of Rambus Inc., a company specializing in high-bandwidth memory technology. After working at Rambus for a year, he returned to Stanford and started a research program in high-speed input/output. Video game machines were early adopters of this technology, with Nintendo 64 and PlayStation 2 the first two mass-produced products to use the company's DRAMs. Intel later adopted the company's RDRAM processor interface, and Rambus memory chips were used in PCs in the late 1990s. Horowitz returned briefly to Rambus in 2005 to help start a research organization at the company and left the board of directors in 2011.

Awards and honors
 IEEE Donald O. Pederson Award in Solid-State Circuits (2006) 
 Member, National Academy of Engineering (inducted 2007)
 Fellow, American Academy of Arts and Sciences (elected 2008)
 SIA University Research Award (2011)
 Fellow, IEEE
 Fellow, Association for Computing Machinery
 Best Paper Award, ISQED (2005) 
 Jack Kilby Outstanding Paper Award, ISSCC (2003) 
 Most influential paper, International Symposium of Computer Arch (1994) 
 Most Influential Paper, International Symposium on Computer Architecture (1989) 
 ChipEx Global Leadership Award (2015). 
 ACM - IEEE CS Eckert–Mauchly Award (2022)

Publications

Books
 J. Acken, A. Agarwal, G. Gulak, M. Horowitz, S. McFarling, S. Richardson, A. Salz, R. Simoni, D. Stark, and S. Tjiang, The MIPS-X RISC Microprocessor. Kluwer Academic Publishers, Boston, MA, 1989. Foreword by J.L. Hennessy.
 S. Bell, J. Pu, J. Hagerty, M. Horowitz, Compiling Algorithms for Heterogeneous Systems, Morgan & Claypool Publishers, 2018.

Book chapters
 Multithreaded Computer Architectures, chapter 8 – "Architectural and Implementation Tradeoffs in the Design of Multiple-Context Processors", Kluwer Academic Publishers, 1994.
 Design of High-Performance Microprocessor Circuits, "High-Speed Electrical Signaling", 2001.
 Power Aware Design Methodologies, chapter 8 – "Energy-Efficient Design of High-Speed Links", Kluwer Academic Publishers, 2002.
 Computational Imaging and Vision, Chapter 7 – "Synthetic Aperture Focusing using Dense Camera Arrays", Volume 35, 2007, pp. 159–172.
 Methods in Enzymology, Chapter 13 – "Alignment of Cryo-Electron Tomography Datasets", Elsevier, 2010, pp. 343–367.

References

External links 
 Personal homepage, Stanford University website
 Google Scholar page

Electrical engineering academics
Living people
Stanford University School of Engineering faculty
Stanford University Department of Electrical Engineering faculty
Members of the United States National Academy of Engineering
MIT School of Engineering alumni
Stanford University School of Engineering alumni
American technology company founders
1957 births